Erica Mitchell (born July 15, 1987) is a women's ice sledge hockey player that compete for the United States women's national ice sledge hockey team. Of note, she was named the captain for the US at the inaugural IPC Ice Sledge Hockey International Women's Cup, which saw the team capture the gold medal. Back in 2007, she had tried out for the United States national men's ice sledge hockey team.

Awards and honors
 USA Hockey Disabled Athlete of the Year in 2007

References

Living people
American sledge hockey players
1987 births